Schrankia macula, the black-spotted schrankia moth, is a moth of the family Erebidae. The species was first described by Herbert Druce in 1891. It is found from North America (including Alabama, Arizona, California, Florida, Georgia, Indiana, Louisiana, Maryland, Massachusetts, Mississippi, Missouri, North Carolina, Oklahoma, South Carolina, Tennessee, Texas and Virginia) to Central America.

The wingspan is 13–18 mm. The forewings are dark brown or gray except for a yellowish area beyond the postmedian line. The hindwings are light gray with an indistinct median line.

The larvae feed on a species of bracket fungus.

References

Moths described in 1891
Hypenodinae